St. Stanislaus Jesuit High School, Gdynia, Poland is a private, Catholic coeducational secondary education institution run by the Society of Jesus in Gdynia Pomeranian Voivodeship, Poland. It was opened by the Jesuits in 1937.

History
St. Stanislaus Jesuit High School was established in 1937 at the Orlowo district of Gdynia Pomeranian, Poland. It was shut down during World War II and after the war by the Polish Government. it opened at its present location in 1994.

See also
 List of Jesuit sites

References  

Schools in Poland
Educational institutions established in 1937
1937 establishments in Poland